is a town located in Hidaka Subprefecture, Hokkaido, Japan.

Erimo is famous for its strong winds, kelp (konbu), and its scenic cape, Cape Erimo (Erimo-misaki). The cape was made famous by Shinichi Mori's enka song Erimo Misaki. It is supposed to be a romantic place to visit. The cape hosts a population of Kurile seals, as well as a museum dedicated to wind (kaze-no-yakata). Winds in Erimo are strong enough that in addition to two windmills on the cape, Erimo Elementary School (built in 2000) is completely powered by electricity generated by its own windmill. This is a common location in Hokkaido to view the first sunrise of the year, and hundreds of people from all over Japan brave the strong, cold wind to watch.

While the main industry is fishing (salmon and squid in particular), Erimo's most famous harvest is kelp which is harvested by most of the native residents during the summer months. The kelp is sold in Japan as Hidaka konbu, and Erimo has a museum in the main part of town dedicated to kelp and fishery.

The Hidaka Mountains come right down to the ocean at Erimo. For that reason, the road north to Hiroo had to be carved out of the rock. In March 2006, due to steady population decline, Erimo's Elementary and Junior High School along this road were closed, and students began busing into the main Junior High in the center of town.

Events 
Cape Erimo is a popular place for the first sunrise of the new year and visitors come not only from Hokkaido but all around Japan. Additionally, since the building of the Museum of the Wind, tourists can enjoy watching the sunrise from within the museum's "Theatre of the Wind".

Mid-January holds the annual Pickling Competition. The housewives of Erimo battle in a competition of homemade pickles. The entrants compete for bragging rights with various pickles, such as sushi rice with pickled radish and sake lees, the locally produced salmon and sandfish.

In early March, the town holds a mini volleyball tournament. Volleyball is popular among the townspeople, and approximately 150 people participate in this tournament.

The camping sites include 10 bungalows, 19 auto partitions and about 100 tent lots. The Hyakuninhama Park Golf Course is popular with the locals as well as park golf enthusiasts.

 is located on a hill overlooking the Pacific Ocean. The park has several variations of cherry blossoms numbering approximately 1,500 trees. In early-to-mid May, these cherry blossoms bloom.

In Shinichi Mori's song Erimo Misaki there is a line which states . In response to this, the youth of the town created an event called . During this event there are many events held including concerts, quiz competitions and karaoke.

 is held in late May and is a greening project. The townspeople are promoting the creation of a rich forest by planting Sakhalin fir and pine every year. Thanks to the endeavors of projects such as this the area around Erimo has changed from a desert into a lush forest.

Starting in mid-July kelp harvesting begins. Fishing and kelp harvesting are a major industry for Erimo and so from mid-July until September many townspeople assist the harvest in the early morning and then go on to their regular jobs. On a clear day following a rainy day, it is not uncommon for many people to take a day off work/school to assist the harvest.

 is held every August. Spectators can enjoy an array of performances of local entertainers and popular songs. However, the most highly anticipated festival event for residents of Erimo and the Hidaka area is the absolutely awe-inspiring display of fireworks.

In September, around the time that kelp harvesting is finished the townspeople have an Autumn Festival. Each district has their own festival in which men from around town carry a portable shrine throughout the city to pray to and give thanks to the Shinto gods of the town.

On the first Sunday of October the town has its . While this event showcases Erimo's local products, the most popular attraction is the "salmon snag." There is also a raffle and "rice cake throw 'n' catch."

Sports 
Its volleyball prowess aside, Erimo has an outstanding youth judo program. Judo is included in the physical education curriculum at both the junior high school and the high school levels. The town is home to the upper elementary school level reigning champion of Hokkaido, who placed first in his category at the prefectural competition of 2015. Its team as a whole placed third overall in the same 2015 tournament. For consecutive years, Erimo's youth judo team has been invited to and competed on a national scale at the annual Tokyo youth judo tournament.

Climate

Mascot 

His name comes from Cape Erimo Kaze no Yakata. He is a harbor seal who wears a cape due to strong winds associated with the town. He is unveiled in 1997.

External links
Official Website

References

Towns in Hokkaido